Nazrulerwan bin Makmor (born 4 May 1980) is a Malaysian professional football manager and former player. He is currently the assistant coach of Malaysia Super League club Kelantan United.

Playing career

Club career
Nazrulerwan has represented eight different team in his career before joining Johor. The greatest success he achieved in his career was with Selangor. During the 2005 Malaysia League season, he was in the Selangor squad that won the Malaysian 'treble' (2005 Malaysia Premier League, Malaysia FA Cup and Malaysia Cup). In 2009, he helped Kelantan to play in the final of the 2009 Malaysia Cup but his team lost to Negeri Sembilan 3–1.

International career
On the international stage, Nazrulerwan only capped once for Malaysia in the match against Cambodia on 18 June 2007. He also selected in Malaysia 2007 Asian Cup squad but did not play in the tournament.

Coaching career
He was the Head coach of Puchong Fuerza.

External links
 

1980 births
Living people
Malaysian people of Malay descent
Malaysian footballers
Malaysia international footballers
2007 AFC Asian Cup players
People from Selangor
Malacca FA players
PKNS F.C. players
Sabah F.C. (Malaysia) players
Sri Pahang FC players
Selangor FA players
Felda United F.C. players
Johor Darul Ta'zim F.C. players
Malaysia Super League players
Association football defenders